Robbie MacNeill (age ) is a guitarist and singer-songwriter who was born in Halifax, Nova Scotia. He attended Queen Elizabeth High School  and studied engineering at Dalhousie University for two years, before moving to Toronto to work as a surveyor in 1964. In the late sixties and early 70's he arranged, conducted and performed with The Privateers, billed as 'Eastern Canada's Only Professional Fork Chorus'. He went on to work with a number of other artists, and released his own album 'Pieces' in 1984. 

In 1967, Robbie met Anne Murray while both were performing on CBC's Singalong Jubilee. She invited him to play backing guitar for her (as a duo) on her early tours of The Maritimes. Their first show together was at a high school in Nova Scotia. They played weekend shows at small venues such as The Monterey (Halifax, NS), The Prince Edward Lounge (Charlottetown, PEI), Wong's (Antigonish, NS), and the Colonial Inn (Amherst, NS). Anne Murray released singles he wrote, including "Robbie's Song for Jesus" and "A Million More.". She also covered 'Let Sunshine Have Its Day', 'Lullaby' and 'Sleep Child' on her albums. In Anne's autobiography All of Me, she said of MacNeill: "... in addition to being a fine guitar player was a wonderful songwriter. To this day his 'A Million More' is one of my favourite songs." Robbie also played on Anne's brother Bruce Murray's 1975 debut, which included a cover of Robbie's 'Sunshine Song'.

Robbie also met John Allan Cameron on Singalong Jubilee around 1967, and from then on was his main backing guitarist for about 25 years. John Allan sometimes gave Robbie the spotlight to showcase his talent. In 1975 The Ottawa Citizen wrote, "Robbie MacNeill opened the second half. He is the essence of the good contemporary folk singer. His voice is clear and distinctive, and his solo guitar is all the accompaniment he needs. He wrote the songs he sang, including Sunshine Love and Evangeline - the beautifully haunting love song he nostalgically wrote for Nova Scotia before moving from Halifax to Toronto two years ago.". Evangeline was published in Coast to Coast Fever  and covered by both Stan Rogers (From Coffee House to Concert Hall) and Raffi (Adult Entertainment). Robbie was the musical director for John Allan's series on CTV., and produced his album 'Weddings, Wakes and Other Things'. John Allan covered Robbie's Song for Jesus on his 1972 album 'Lord Of The Dance'.

Other friends from Singalong Jubilee include Gene MacLellan and Brian Ahern (producer). Brian and Robbie formed a band that was briefly courted by the music industry in Toronto until a member quit. Brian handled Robbie's publishing under his company Tessa in the early 70's, but no album was recorded. Robbie was a member of the trio Country Fair (which later became Graham County), with Toronto singer-songwriter Don Graham.

He has performed solo at music festivals such as the Home County Folk Festival in London, Ontario the Vancouver Folk Music Festival and the Coffee House at the Coming Home to Brookfield annual celebration, in Brookfield, Nova Scotia.

References

Living people
Year of birth missing (living people)
Musicians from Halifax, Nova Scotia
Canadian guitarists
Canadian singer-songwriters